Chonchon may refer to:

 Chonchon, mythological creature of the Mapuche mythology
 Chonchón, mythological creature of the Chilean mythology
 Chonchon, familiarly nickname of Marie-François-Xavier, daughter of Jeanne Dupleix#Children from Mr. Vincens
 Chonchon County, kun, or county, in central Chagang province, North Korea
 Paul Chonchon, Guadelupean basketball player and trainer
 Hall des Sports Paul Chonchon, Basketball stadion named after Paul Chonchon in Pointe-à-Pitre, Guadeloupe
 Taku no chonchon, List of Nikkatsu Roman Porno films

See also

 
 
 Chon (disambiguation)